Forgive us our Sins (orig. French Pardonnez nos offenses) is the title of a historical novel by Romain Sardou.

Plot summary

Imagine staging the end of the world and observing the effects of this apocalypse on an isolated, rural village… imagine a group of powerful Vatican clerics coldly orchestrating such an experiment in search of scientific and theological "truth"…

1284 Heurteloup is a village tucked away in the marshlands of South West France. It has been cut off from the rest of the world for forty years and - so it seems - ignored by everyone including the local diocese and the state. Neighbouring townsfolk do not dare venture anywhere near Heurteloup - it is a place that inspires terror, a name that conjures up evil spirits, darkness and savagery. Not so long ago, the remains of corpses were found floating in a river, dragged by the current straight from the banks of the cursed town.

One man decides to set off to try to save the "soul" of Heurteloup: his name is Father Henno Gui. A newly ordained priest, Gui is driven purely by faith and his sense of vocation. He is accompanied by two loyal companions: a young boy, Floris, and a giant-like man, Mardi Gras, whose disproportionate size and disfigured face terrify onlookers.

Having walked for days, fighting their way through thick forests, Gui and his companions arrive at Heurteloup. The village is deserted and there is not a soul in sight. The Church is in ruins and the dwellings appear uninhabited. But when Gui looks carefully, he notices traces of recent human activity, and he can sense that their every move is being watched. He has no idea where the villagers are hiding. Most importantly, he can tell from effigies and statuettes of women that these hidden villagers worship ‘Gods’ of a very unorthodox kind…

So begins this violent story of power and corruption, where magic and superstition coexist alongside Catholicism and the stranglehold of the Vatican. Romain Sardou recreates the period as he weaves philosophical and religious questions through a chilling tale of murder and betrayal.

Historical Characters in the Novel 

 Pope Martin IV

See also

 Eschatology
 Experiment
 Aristotle
 Middle Ages in history

Translations

 Catalonia : Rosa del Vents
 Czech Republic : Argo
 Finland : Bazar
 Germany : Karl Blessing
 Greece : Livanis
 Netherlands : Luitingh
 Italy : Sonzogno
 Korea : Open Books
 Latin America : Grijalbo
 Norway : Bazar
 Poland : Bertelsmann Media
 Portugal : Europa-América
 Russia : FLC Bertelsmann
 Spain : Grijalbo
 Sweden : Bazar

Review

"The story shows all the verve of its young author. This medieval thriller cannot but inspire comparisons with Umberto Eco’s bestseller, The Name of the Rose . But whereas the author of Baudolino enjoys losing his reader, Romain Sardou goes straight to the heart. " -  Le Parisien

 Thriller set in the Middle Ages
 Original Publication Date: Fall 2002
 
 Original Publishers : Editions XO

External links
 Romain Sardou’s Website
 French Publisher's Website
 Sources for this page

2002 French novels
French historical novels
Fiction set in the 1280s
Novels set in France